Warfield is a census-designated place (CDP) in Brunswick County, Virginia, United States. The population as of the 2010 Census was 115.

The settlement is located along a former railroad. The Richmond, Petersburg and Carolina Railroad, passing through Warfield from Petersburg, Virginia to Ridgeway Junction (today Norlina, North Carolina), was completed in 1900, at which point it was merged into the Seaboard Air Line (SAL). A railway station was built at some point by 1914, when the population of Warfield was estimated by the railroad to be somewhere around 100. The line (dubbed the "S" line after later mergers) continued to operate until the 1980s, and today Warfield is along the abandoned portion of the CSX Norlina Subdivision.

References

Virginia Trend Report 2: State and Complete Places (Sub-state 2010 Census Data)

Unincorporated communities in Virginia
Census-designated places in Brunswick County, Virginia
Census-designated places in Virginia